ÅIF may refer to:

Åndalsnes IF
Åssiden IF

See also
AIF (disambiguation)